The 2017–18 Moldovan National Division season, was the 27th season of the top basketball league in Moldova.

Basco are the defending champions.

Competition format
Five teams joined the regular season, played as a double-legged round-robin tournament. The four best qualified teams joined the playoffs, that would be played in a best-of-five format.

Teams

Regular season

League table

Playoffs
Playoffs started on 4 March 2018 and ended on 6 May 2018. Teams that placed better at the end of the regular season played games 1, 2 and 5 at home.

References

External links
Moldovan Basketball Federation
Moldovan league on Eurobasket

Moldovan
Basketball in Moldova